Forrest Grady "Spec" Towns (February 6, 1914 – April 9, 1991) was an American track and field athlete. He was the 1936 Olympic champion in the 110 m hurdles and broke the world record in that event three times.

Born in Fitzgerald, Georgia, Towns grew up in Augusta, Georgia, where he played football in high school at Richmond Academy. In 1933, he earned a football scholarship to the University of Georgia (UGA) after a sports journalist had seen him high jumping in his backyard.

Rather than high jumping, Towns specialized in the high hurdles, winning NCAA and AAU titles in the 120 y hurdles event in 1935. It was the beginning of a 60 race winning streak, lasting until 1937.

In 1936, Towns was named to the American Olympic team, becoming the first Georgian to achieve this. During the Olympics in Berlin, Germany, Towns became the world record holder with 14.1, and he won the Olympic gold in 14.2.  Also, he became the first Georgian to earn Olympic Gold.  Shortly after the Games, he became the first hurdler under 14 seconds. At a race in Oslo, he dramatically improved the world record to 13.7 – a time that would stand until 1950.

After college, Towns became Head Track and Field coach at UGA, a position he held until 1975. In 1991, he died of a heart attack in Athens, Georgia at age 77. He was honored at the University with the naming of the Spec Towns Track, and an annual meet called the Spec Towns Invitational.

Towns was the official starter for the first-ever Peachtree Road Race on July 4, 1970.

See also 
 Olympic medalists in athletics (men)

Greek bibliography: Andreou,Evangelos: "The star of champion shone..." Ed. EUARCE 2011 ('"Forrest Towns" p. 30,105') Ευάγγελος Ανδρέου, Το αστέρι του πρωταθλητή άναψε... / ο βαλκανιονίκης του μεσοπολέμου Γιάννης Σκιαδάς, EUARCE 2011    ("Φόρεστ Τάουνς/Forrest Towns" σ.30,105)

References

External links

 Extensive biography
 Georgia Sports Hall of Fame profile 
 Forrest “Spec” Towns at the Georgia Sports Hall of Fame
 

1914 births
1991 deaths
American male hurdlers
Athletes (track and field) at the 1936 Summer Olympics
Olympic gold medalists for the United States in track and field
Georgia Bulldogs track and field athletes
Georgia Bulldogs and Lady Bulldogs track and field coaches
Georgia Bulldogs football coaches
People from Fitzgerald, Georgia
Track and field athletes from Georgia (U.S. state)
Medalists at the 1936 Summer Olympics
Georgia Bulldogs football players